The year 1978 was the 7th year after the independence of Bangladesh. It was also the second year of the Government of Ziaur Rahman.

Incumbents

 President: Ziaur Rahman
 Prime Minister: Mashiur Rahman (starting 29 June)
 Chief Justice: Syed A. B. Mahmud Hossain (until 31 January), Kemaluddin Hossain (starting 1 February)

Demography

Climate

Economy

Note: For the year 1978 average official exchange rate for BDT was 15.02 per US$.

Events
 18 February - Boxing legend Muhammad Ali arrives in Bangladesh for a 5-day visit.
 3 June - Ziaur Rahman wins presidential election and secures his position for a five-year term.
 28 June - The ashes of Atiśa Dipankara Shrijnana brought to Bangladesh from Tibet.
 Bangladesh is elected to a two-year term on the UN Security Council.
 As a result of Operation King Dragon by the Burmese junta, the first wave of Rohingya refugees entered Bangladesh in 1978. An estimated 200,000 Rohingyas took shelter in Cox's Bazar. Diplomatic initiatives over 16 months resulted in a repatriation agreement, which allowed the return of most refugees under a process facilitated by UNHCR.

Awards and recognitions

International Recognition
 Tahrunessa Abdullah, A social worker who championed the role of women in improving their families' livelihoods, was awarded Ramon Magsaysay Award.

Independence Day Award

Ekushey Padak

 Khan Mohammad Moinuddin (literature)
 Ahsan Habib (literature)
 Zulfikar Haidar (literature)
 Mahbubul Alam (literature)
 Natyaguru Nurul Momen (literature)
 Ava Alam (music)
 Safiuddin Ahmed (art)
 Serajuddin Hossain (journalism)
 Sayed Moazzem Hossain (art)

Sports
 International football:1978 AFC Youth Championship held in Dhaka, Bangladesh from 5 October to 28 October 1978.
 Domestic football: Mohammedan SC won Dhaka League title, while Brothers Union came out runners-up.

Births
 Ananta Jalil, actor, director, businessman
 Nafees Bin Zafar, software engineer

Deaths
 17 January: Muzaffar Ahmed Chowdhury, academician (b. 1922)
 4 March: Abul Kalam Shamsuddin, author (b. 1897)
 29 March: Ibrahim Khan, writer (b. 1894)
 18 June: Zahidur Rahim, music exponent (b. 1935)
 13 August: Muhammad Siddiq Khan, librarian (b. 1910)

See also 
 1970s in Bangladesh
 List of Bangladeshi films of 1978
 Timeline of Bangladeshi history

References